Crossroads School for Arts & Sciences is a private, K–12, independent, college preparatory school in Santa Monica, California, United States. The school is a former member of the G20 Schools Group.

History
The school was founded in 1971 as a secular institution affiliated with St. Augustine By-the-Sea Episcopal Church in Santa Monica. Although the founders, and many of the school's original students, came from the former St. Augustine By-the-Sea Episcopal Day School in Santa Monica, Crossroads School has always been a secular institution. Crossroads started with three rooms in a Baptist church offering grades seven and eight, and an initial enrollment of just over 30 students. The name Crossroads was suggested by Robert Frost's poem, "The Road Not Taken", in which Frost writes:

Two roads diverged in a yellow wood, and I,
I took the one less traveled by,
And that has made all the difference.

As St. Augustine's grew to junior and senior high school, the founders started Crossroads with a separate board of directors and separate campus, which eventually merged in the 1980s under the name Crossroads.

In the media
The 2004 book Hollywood Interrupted, by Andrew Breitbart and Mark Ebner, dedicated a large section to Crossroads; it depicted the school (and the celebrities who send their children there) in a negative light, focusing mainly on a handful of high-profile parents and "drug problems" stemming from the 1980s. The school was also featured in a May 2005 issue of Vanity Fair; like Breitbart's book, it also focused on the school's celebrity clientele.

Notable alumni

J. A. Adande, sports journalist
Maude Apatow, actress
Sean Astin, actor, director and producer
Henry Baum, writer, blogger and musician
Michael Bay, film director and producer
Z Berg, musician
Jack Black, actor, comedian, musician, and YouTube personality
Max Brooks, actor and author
Gary Coleman, actor, comedian, and writer
Austin Croshere, NBA basketball player and TV broadcaster
Baron Davis, NBA basketball player and TV commentator
Emily Deschanel, actress, director and producer
Zooey Deschanel, actress, model, and singer-songwriter
Alden Ehrenreich, actor
Maya Erskine actress and TV writer
Zack Fleishman, professional tennis player
Robert Francis, musician
Nicole Gibbs, professional tennis player
Lauren Greenfield, artist, photographer, and filmmaker
Petra Haden, musician and singer
Rachel Haden, musician
Tanya Haden, artist, cellist, and singer
Simon Helberg, actor, comedian and musician
Jonah Hill, actor, director, producer, screenwriter, and comedian
Oliver Hudson, actor
Kate Hudson, actress, author, and fashion entrepreneur
Bronny James, basketball player
Brody Jenner, television personality, disc jockey and model
Jenni Konner, television writer, producer and director
Alex Kurtzman, film and television writer, producer, and director
Alexandra Kyle, actress
Zosia Mamet, actress and musician
Milo Manheim, actor
Shareef O'Neal, basketball player
Roberto Orci, film and television writer and producer
Gwyneth Paltrow, actress, businesswoman and author
Amy Pascal, business executive and film producer
Whitney Port, television personality and fashion designer 
Jack Quaid, actor 
Jason Ritter, actor and producer
Maya Rudolph, actress, comedian, singer, and voice actress
Tamir Saban (born 1999), American-Israeli basketball player 
Blake Schwarzenbach, musician
Evan Spiegel, businessman, co-founder of Snapchat
Dayna Tortorici, writer
Liv Tyler, actress and former model
Andrew von Oeyen, classical musician
Gillian Welch, musician
Jessica Yellin, journalist

References

External links

 Crossroads School Website

Preparatory schools in California
Schools in Los Angeles County, California
Buildings and structures in Santa Monica, California
Private K-12 schools in Los Angeles County, California
Educational institutions established in 1971
1971 establishments in California
Organizations based in Santa Monica, California